Before the Buildings Fell a solo album by dark ambient artist Sam Rosenthal, a member of Black Tape for a Blue Girl and founder of Projekt Records. It was released in 1986 by Projekt Records and reissued on CD in 2000 with enhanced content.

Track listing
"Kathryn"
"Diversion"
"Resolution"
"The Room"
"Jane"
"Leading to the Edge"
"Before the Buildings Fell"
"Fragments of Benediction"
"The Amber Girl"

Sources

Black Tape for a Blue Girl albums
1986 debut albums
Projekt Records albums